Suwanee is an unincorporated community in Lyon County, Kentucky, United States.

History
Significant deposits of iron ore were found at Suwanee. Suwanee contained a blast furnace until about 1860.

References

Unincorporated communities in Lyon County, Kentucky
Unincorporated communities in Kentucky